The cliff parakeet (Myiopsitta luchsi) is a Near Threatened species of bird in subfamily Arinae of the family Psittacidae, the African and New World parrots. It is endemic to Bolivia.

Taxonomy and systematics

The International Ornithological Committee and BirdLife International's Handbook of the Birds of the World treat the cliff parakeet as a species. The South American Classification Committee of the American Ornithological Society and the Clements taxonomy treat it as a subspecies of the monk parakeet, (M. monachus).

Description

Adults have a gray face, throat, and breast and a yellow belly. Their flanks, vent, undertail coverts, and thighs are green. Their hindcrown, nape, and back are various shades of green. Their central tail feathers are dark green to bluish and ther rest have green outer webs and yellow inner webs and tips. Their primaries, outer secondaries, and their coverts are blue and the rest of the wing green. Their bill is yellowish brown, sometimes with a rose tinge. Their iris is dark brown and their eye is surrounded by bare gray skin.

Distribution and habitat

The cliff parakeet is found in Bolivia's Chuquisaca, Cochabamba, La Paz, Potosí and Santa Cruz departments. It inhabits dry intermontane valleys where xerophytic vegetation is near cliffs.

Behavior

Movement

The cliff parakeet is believed to be non-migratory.

Feeding

The cliff parakeet's diet is mostly fruits and seeds but also includes maize taken from cultivated fields.

Breeding

The cliff parakeet builds a bulky stick nest on cliffs. Unlike the nests of the monk parakeet, they are not communal, but may be built close together. (The two species are the only parrots that do not nest in cavities or burrows.) The clutch size is thought to be about six eggs. There is some evidence that two broods are sometimes raised in one year.

Status

The IUCN originally assessed the cliff parakeet as being of Least Concern but since 2021 has rated it Near Threatened. It has a very limited range and its estimated population of fewer than 10,000 mature individuals is believed to be decreasing. It does not occur uniformly across its range and is persecuted as a crop pest.

References

cliff parakeet
Birds of Bolivia
cliff parakeet
cliff parakeet